Fishbasket Lake is a lake in the Unorganized Part of Kenora District in northwestern Ontario, Canada. The lake is in the Hudson Bay drainage basin and is the source of the Fishbasket River.

The primary inflow is the water arriving directly from Mameigwess Lake at the centre east of the lake. The primary outflow, at the northwest tip of the lake, is the Fishbasket River, which flows to Winisk Lake, and then via the Winisk River to Hudson Bay.

References

Lakes of Kenora District